Mono Tono is the second album by the Skiantos, released in 1978 by Cramps Records.

Tracce 
 Eptadone
 Panka rock
 Pesto duro (I kunt get no satisfucktion)
 Diventa demente (la kultura poi ti kura)
 Io me la meno
 Bau bau baby
 Io sono uno skianto
 Io ti amo da matti (sesso & karnazza)
 Vortice
 Massacrami pure
 Largo all'avanguardia
 Ehi, ehi, ma che piedi che c'hai

Line up
 Roberto "Freak" Antoni - voice
 Fabio "Dandy Bestia" Testoni - guitar
 Andrea "Jimmy Bellafronte" Setti - voice
 Stefano "Sbarbo" Cavedoni - voice
 Andrea "Andy Bellombrosa" Dalla Valle - guitar
 Franco "Frankie Grossolani" Villani - bass guitar
 Leo "Tormento Pestoduro" Ghezzi - drums

References

1978 albums
Skiantos albums